Seán Keane (born 12 July 1946) is an Irish fiddler, teacher and former member of The Chieftains. He was a member of Ceoltóirí Chualann in the 1960s, before joining The Chieftains in 1968. He has a unique style, especially in his use of ornamentation, perhaps influenced by the music of the uilleann pipes.

Early life

Keane was born into a musical family in Drimnagh, a suburb of Dublin, Ireland. Keane's mother and father were both fiddle players from musical communities in County Longford and County Clare, respectively, and would host many traditional players who traveled from all over Ireland to perform in Dublin city. The Keane household became a landmark in Dublin's traditional music scene in the 1950s and 1960s. These guests greatly influenced Keane and his brother, James, an accordion player, as did their summer trips to Longford and Clare where they encountered much traditional music.

Legacy

In May 1981, Keane was profiled on RTÉ's Hand Me Down series, which looks at how traditional music is handed on from generation to generation. Each program features a traditional artist and looks at how they inherited Irish music from their family. In this extract from the program, Keane plays solo before accompanying members of the Castle Céilí Band with the Mullagh set dancers at the Willie Clancy Summer School. The Castle Céilí Band were reformed especially for the program which is now archived in the RTÉ Libraries and Archives.

In March 2019, Keane was featured on Season 8 episode 1 of TG4's documentary series 'Sé Mo Laoch, which features on some of Ireland's greatest traditional musicians. The 25 minute-long documentary looked at his life and career from his childhood up until the present day and is archived on TG4 Player.

Personal life

Keane is married and has three children, Deirdre, Páraic and Darach. Darach and Páraic are both excellent musicians. The majority of Seán's grandchildren play: Molly, Alex and Ella play fiddle. Loulou and Clara play concertina. Ruby plays cell, while Jack plays uilleann pipes/tin whistle. His other grandchildren are Doireann, Páidí and Seán Óg.

Discography

Solo albums
 Gusty's Frolics (1975)
 Seán Keane (1982)
 Jig it in Style (1990)

Collaborations
 Reel Away the Real World (with James Keane and Mick Moloney) (1980)
 Contentment is Wealth (with Matt Molloy) (1985)
 The Fire Aflame (with Matt Molloy and Liam O'Flynn) (1993)
 Fire in the Kitchen (with Paddy Moloney) (1998)

References

External links
 
 Irish Traditional Music Archive
 Hand Me Down (RTÉ Archives)
 'Sé Mo Laoch (TG4 Player)

1946 births
Living people
20th-century violinists
21st-century violinists
Ceoltóirí Chualann members
Claddagh Records artists
Dublin fiddlers
Irish fiddlers
Irish folk musicians
Musicians from County Dublin
The Chieftains members